Waterloo was launched in 1815 at St Martin's, New Brunswick. She was registered at Saint John, New Brunswick in 1825, but then sold at Newcastle in 1826. After her launch she started trading between England and what is now Canada.

Waterloo first appeared in Lloyd's Register in 1816 C.Ward, master, changing to Blakeston, J.Ward & Co., owners, and trade New Brunswick–Liverpool. She spent most of career sailing between England and North America, particularly Canada. She was last listed in 1848.

Citations and references
Citations

References
 

1815 ships
Ships built in Canada
Age of Sail  merchant ships of England